United States House Committee on Interstate and Foreign Commerce (1891–1981), which became the United States House Committee on Energy and Commerce
 United States Senate Committee on Interstate Commerce (1887–1947) or Interstate and Foreign Commerce (1947–1961), which merged into the United States Senate Committee on Commerce, Science, and Transportation